More Money Than God: Hedge Funds and the Making of a New Elite (2010) is a financial book by Sebastian Mallaby published by Penguin Press. Mallaby's work has been published in the Financial Times, The Washington Post, The New York Times, The Wall Street Journal, and the Atlantic Monthly as columnist, editor and editorial board member. He is a senior fellow for international economics at the Council on Foreign Relations (CFR). The book is a history of the hedge fund industry in the United States looking at the people, institutions, investment tools and concepts of hedge funds. It claims to be the "first authoritative history of the hedge fund industry." It is written for a general audience and originally published by Penguin Press. It was nominated for the 2010 Financial Times and Goldman Sachs Business Book of the Year Award and was one of The Wall Street Journals 10-Best Books of 2010. The Journal said it was "The fullest account we have so far of a too-little-understood business that changed the shape of finance and no doubt will continue to do so."

In a review in The New York Times, the book was called a "smart history of the hedge fund business" that explains "how finance’s richest moguls made their loot," and "argues that the obsessive, charismatic oddballs of the hedge fund world are Wall Street’s future — and possibly its salvation."

Summary
In each chapter, Mallaby takes a narrative focus on one individual or company that played an important role in the history of hedge funds. Mallaby then weaves in other people, ideas or companies related to the star of the chapter. The following are some of the major people, institutions and concepts on a per chapter basis. The first in each list is the central character of that chapter.

Ch 1 Big Daddy: A. W. Jones, Hedge fund
Ch 2 The Block Trader: Michael Steinhardt, Steinhardt, Fine, Berkowitz & Co., Block trade, Monetary policy
Ch 3 Paul Samuelson's Secret: Commodities Corporation, Paul Samuelson, Bruce Kovner (Caxton Corporation), Trend trading, Automated trading system 
Ch 4 The Alchemist: George Soros, Quantum Fund, Reflexivity, Jim Rogers
Ch 5 Top Cat: Julian Robertson, Tiger Management
Ch 6 Rock-and-Roll Cowboy: Paul Tudor Jones II
Ch 7 White Wednesday: Black Wednesday, Stanley Druckenmiller and George Soros
Ch 8 Hurricane Greenspan: Shadow banking system, 1994 bond market crisis, Stanley Druckenmiller and George Soros
Ch 9 Soros vs Soros: 1997 Asian financial crisis, 1998 Russian financial crisis, Stanley Druckenmiller and George Soros
Ch 10 The Enemy Is Us: Long-Term Capital Management, John Meriwether
Ch 11 The Dot-Com Double: Dot-com bubble, Tiger Management and Quantum Fund
Ch 12 The Yale Men: David Swensen, Tom Steyer, Event-driven investing
Ch 13 The Code Breakers: Renaissance Technologies, James Simons, David E. Shaw
Ch 14 Premonitions of a Crisis: Amaranth Advisors, Brian Hunter
Ch 15 Riding the Storm: John Paulson, Subprime mortgage crisis
Ch 16 "How Could They Do This": Financial crisis of 2007–08

Editions
More Money Than God: Hedge Funds and the Making of a New Elite. Penguin Press, 2010. Hardcover USA. 
More Money Than God: Hedge Funds and the Making of a New Elite. Penguin Paperbacks, 2011. Paperback USA. 
More Money Than God: Hedge Funds and the Making of a New Elite. Bloomsbury Publishing, 2011. Paperback UK. 
Kindle other electronic book editions.
Audiobook edition by Audible Audio, narrated by Alan Nebelthau.

See also
The Quants (2010) a by Scott Patterson
The Big Short (2010) by Michael Lewis

References

External links
After Words interview with Mallaby on More Money Than God, August 28, 2010

2010 non-fiction books
Finance books
Business books
Penguin Press books